{| class="infobox" width=330
|-
| align="center" |  '1868 in New Zealand: 
|- style="background-color:#f3f3f3"
| align="center" | Other years in New Zealand
|-
| align="center" | 1865 | 1866 | 1867 | 1868 | 1869 | 1870 | 1871
|}
The following lists events that happened during 1868 in New Zealand.

Incumbents

Regal and viceregal
Head of State — Queen Victoria
Governor — Sir George Grey is recalled by the British government and is replaced on 5 February by Sir George Ferguson Bowen.

Government and law
The 4th Parliament continues. The first four Māori MPs are elected in 1868.

Speaker of the House — Sir David Monro
Premier — Edward Stafford
Minister of Finance — William Fitzherbert
Chief Justice — Hon Sir George Arney

Main centre leaders
Mayor of Christchurch — William Wilson
Mayor of Dunedin — John Hyde Harris followed by Thomas Birch

 Events 
1–6 February: The Great storm of 1868 sweeps across the country causing major damage and loss of life.
1 June: The New Zealand Advertiser, which had been absorbed into the New Zealand Times in 1867, is revived. It ceases publication for good in December.
13 August: A tsunami caused by the 1868 Arica earthquake in South America causes the only fatalities recorded from tsunamis in New Zealand, with about twenty people swept away in the Chatham Islands. 
24 August: Wanganui Horticultural Society established.
 Nelson Football Club founded.
2 November: New Zealand Mean Time adopted throughout the colony; New Zealand may be the first country to have adopted a standard time throughout the country.
 Coromandel Gold Rush (1867–68)

Sport

Cricket
The Basin Reserve is first used for cricket.

Horse racing

Major race winners
New Zealand Cup: Flying Jib
New Zealand Derby: Flying Jib

Shooting
Ballinger Belt: Sergeant Taylor (Otago)

Births
 23 February Sir Andrew Hamilton Russell, soldier.
 19 March: Alfred Ransom, politician and cabinet minister.

Full date unknown
Asajiro Noda, seaman, cashier, gum-digger and farmer (d. 1942)

Deaths
 9 October: George Macfarlan''', politician

See also
History of New Zealand
List of years in New Zealand
Military history of New Zealand
Timeline of New Zealand history
Timeline of New Zealand's links with Antarctica
Timeline of the New Zealand environment

References
General
 Romanos, J. (2001) New Zealand Sporting Records and Lists.'' Auckland: Hodder Moa Beckett. 
Specific

External links